Roberval—Lac-Saint-Jean (formerly known as Roberval) was a federal electoral district in Quebec, Canada, that represented in the House of Commons of Canada from 1949 until 2015.

The riding was created in 1947 from parts of Lake St-John—Roberval riding. It was dissolved into Lac-Saint-Jean and Jonquière during the 2012 electoral redistribution.

The neighbouring ridings are Abitibi—Baie-James—Nunavik—Eeyou, Chicoutimi—Le Fjord, Jonquière—Alma, Montmorency—Charlevoix—Haute-Côte-Nord, and Saint-Maurice—Champlain.

This is the riding with the highest percentage of non-immigrants (99.4%) and of people with French as their home language (also 99.4%).

Members of Parliament

This riding has elected the following Members of Parliament:

Election results

Roberval—Lac-Saint-Jean, 2004 – 2015

Change is from by-election

Roberval, 1947 – 2004

							

							

						

Note: Social Credit vote is compared to Ralliement créditiste vote in the 1968 election.

						

Note: Ralliement créditiste vote is compared to Social Credit vote in the 1963 election.

See also
 List of Canadian federal electoral districts
 Past Canadian electoral districts

References

Campaign expense data from Elections Canada
Riding history from the Library of Parliament
Riding history since 2004
2011 Results from Elections Canada

Notes

Former federal electoral districts of Quebec
Roberval, Quebec
Saint-Félicien, Quebec